Qash is an administrative ward in the Kongwa district of the Manyara Region of Tanzania. According to the 2012 census, the ward has a total population of 19,549.

References

Babati District
Wards of Manyara Region